Podemos Andalusia is the regional and federal branch of Podemos in Andalusia, Spain. In the primary election which concluded on 14 February 2015, Teresa Rodríguez was elected to be the secretary.

At the Andalusian regional election, 2015 she obtained 15 deputies.

Electoral performance

Parliament of Andalusia

Cortes Generales

Andalusia

 * Within Unidos Podemos for Andalusia.

European Parliament

 * Within Unidas Podemos Cambiar Europa.

Symbols

Notes

References

Political parties in Andalusia
Andalusia